The LDV Maxus is a light commercial van model, originally produced by LDV Limited. It was launched at the end of 2004. The model was jointly developed under the LD100 programme code by LDV and Daewoo Motor, prior to Daewoo entering receivership in November 2000, in a five year, £500 million development programme. It was intended to replace LDV's Convoy model, and Daewoo Motor Polska's Lublin II model. A narrower derivative sharing the bodysides of the SWB low-roof versions was partially developed under the BD100 codename to replace LDV's Pilot model, but this never reached production.

Following General Motors' acquisition of Daewoo, LDV secured the exclusive rights to the vehicle, purchased the tooling, and moved it from Daewoo's plant in Lublin, Poland to the LDV site in Washwood Heath, Birmingham. A version of the Maxus is manufactured by GAZ.

In March 2011, the Chinese company SAIC Motor launched a new commercial vehicle marque called Maxus, following its acquisition of the intellectual property of LDV in 2010. The LDV Maxus model was relaunched by SAIC as the V80 in June 2011.

History

Since its launch, the Maxus received good reviews and sold well across the United Kingdom. The van was used on the fleet basis by companies, such as National Grid, Royal Mail, and various services of the British Police.

Not long after its launch, the LDV Maxus was awarded the Professional Van and Light Truck Magazine "Van of the Year 2005", and has since won several further awards including "Van of the Year", "Minibus of the Year" and "Combi of the Year".

LDV was acquired in July 2006 by the Russian automotive giant GAZ, that had plans to start production of the Maxus in one of its Russian factories by 2010, but the LDV factory went into administration in June 2009, due to lack of funds from Russian owner GAZ.

About 800 workers were laid off during this period, leaving the whole van building operation in question. It had been hoped that the Malaysian company Weststar LDV, which distributed the Maxus under licence in Asia, Europe and the Middle East, would acquire LDV, but the deal fell through the week before LDV entered administration.

In 2008, LDV manufactured 10,000 vans, generating sales of about £150 million, but lost £54 million in 2008 and the first quarter of 2009, before the failure of the company.

In August 2010, China's SAIC, which bought most of the LDV assets, planned to launch the Chinese version of Maxus in 2011, and in April 2011 announced the Maxus would be called the Datong (meaning big wisdom and smooth in Chinese) under its new Maxus brand.

The Maxus was available in two wheelbases, three roof heights, and a choice of 2.8t, 3.2t, and 3.5t GVW. The vehicle was also available in these roles:
 Multi-purpose role, mixing seats and space for the transport of goods
 Minibus (passenger van) version providing 10, 12, 15 or 17 seats
 Chassis cab version with dropside, tipper, luton and box vans

A platinum version became available with metallic paint, alloy wheels, air conditioning, tinted windows, and additional front fog lights

Maxus V80
Available from the summer of 2011, the Chinese built V80, marketed under the new Maxus marque, is available in three versions: standard, logistics, and deluxe. The Minibus is available from 7 to 16 seaters, in two trim levels. The choice of two wheelbases remains, with two different versions of the 2.5-litre diesel engine producing 88 or 100 kW.

Colour choices include crystal violet, olive-brown and aurora silver for deluxe variants, blanc white, aurora silver and lava grey for standard and the logistics variant only with blanc white. The Maxus V80 is exported to English speaking countries under the LDV brand. Australia and New Zealand were the first to receive exports in 2012.

In 2013, the Maxus V80 was exported to Thailand, in May 2014, to Colombia, in May 2015, to Ireland, and in 2016, to the United Kingdom.

FCV80
A plug-in hybrid fuel cell version of the V80 the FCV80 a light passenger was launched in November 2017 at the Guangzhou International Automobile Exhibition. It has a 14.3 kWh Lithium-Ion battery that can be charged (plug-in AC) in four hours. The FCV80 can seat 10 to 14 passengers. In 2020, the FCV80 had recorded sales of 297 vehicles.

MG V80
The V80 is marketed as the MG V80 in Thailand since March 2019. The Thai-spec V80 is powered by a 2.5-litre diesel-turbo sourced from VM Motori. Outputs are rated at 136 hp and 330Nm. There are two transmission types to choose from: six-speed manual; or single-clutch automatic (automated manual).

References

External links

 Official LDV Maxus website (Archive copy)
 Official Fargo Fora website (Archive copy)
 SAIC Maxus V80 website (Archive copy)
 LDV Ireland website

Maxus
V80
Vans
Minibuses
Vehicles introduced in 2004
Vehicles introduced in 2011